Zipline Creative Limited is a South Wales based film, TV and radio production company, best known for its BBC Series Rhod Gilbert's Work Experience and contribution to the Cow – Don't Text And Drive campaign with Gwent Police. The company, founded in 2008 by two former BBC employees, is now based in Risca, in southeast Wales, and produces work for TV, radio and corporate clients.

Viral Films

Cow – 2008 

"Cow" effective due to its highly graphic nature, affected the national debate in the United States about texting and driving. Following rapid viral success, major news outlets like The Today Show and all the national networks began to cover the film's impact. This was followed by worldwide coverage on news networks, online and in print. Furthermore, the film earned honours in the Advertising Age's weekly Creativity Top 5 video. It is now considered the most successful viral Public safety announcement yet experienced on the web.

The film began humbly, originally commissioned by Gwent Police to be shown only in schools in the county. Having previously worked with local director Peter Watkins Hughes, they were approached by him to produce and shoot the new project on a modest budget. Zipline's core team, Nathan Mackintosh and Rhys Waters, were previously students on Peter's Documentary Film and Television Degree course, who were still working locally and in the process of setting up their own company.

Mackintosh and Waters based themselves in a small unit near Tredegar where they built a large green screen with enough space for a car to be wheeled in front. Alongside this, three identical Ford Kas, two identical Ford Mondeos and two Ford Fiestas were donated to the project by a local car dealer. An abandoned road was chosen to crash the cars in Tafarnaubach Industrial Estate, several miles from the unit. With help from young film makers, local fire fighters and engineers, the team successfully crashed the cars with a multiple camera setup, including a birds-eye view on the impact using a Sony PD170 attached to the bucket of a JCB.

The remains of the vehicle were then transported to the green screen unit, and the internal shots of the impact were filmed with the actresses. Nathan, who acted as DOP also was responsible for the special effects on this scene. Over several months he added the additional layers of blood, smoke and glass.

Following its release online and in current affairs outlets, "Cow" was broadcast on BBC Wales and was then picked up by BBC Three under the banner "Only Stwpid COWZ Txt N Drive".

Television

Rhod Gilbert's Work Experience 

Series 1 (2010): Originally commissioned for BBC One Wales and following a successful broadcast, BBC Two decided to broadcast the show on its Wednesday 10 PM slot. The Zipline team worked freelance as producer/directors, editors and also on camera and sound on the series for Presentable RDF. Classed as factual entertainment, the series followed Rhod Gilbert as he tried out jobs he believed to be tougher than being a stand-up comedian.
Series 2 (2011): Following the success of the first series on both BBC 2 and BBC One Wales, the original team was commissioned to produce another series of four episodes. The decision was made not to alter the format, aside from having mini sketches of Rhod doing his homework before each role. This choice was based on the thought that it was not the format that attracted people, but Rhods interaction with 'real' characters and allowing them their own space to shine on screen.
Series 3 (2012): The third series was commissioned in late 2011, with Zipline Creative appointed as co-producers as well as producer/directors for the series for the first time. It was shown on BBC One Wales and BBC 2's 10PM comedy slot during winter of 2012. The team decided to try a mix of normal and more eccentric roles for Rhod to attempt, including 'School Teacher' which turned out to be one of the most popular episodes in the show's history.
Series 4 (2013): A fourth series of Work Experience was commissioned in late 2012, again with Zipline Creative in their permanent role of co-producers of the show alongside Presentable. Most of the filming took place in spring 2013 and the series was broadcast on BBC One Wales in June. It was also broadcast on BBC 2's 10PM slot in August, and repeated on BBC Wales the following year in April 2014.
Series 5 (2014): The fifth series was commissioned in early 2014, and was aired on BBC One in the autumn of 2014.

Gareth Thomas : Game Changer - 2014 

A 60-minute profile feature, documenting the life of the popular Welsh international rugby star. Broadcast on 26 October 2014.

Radio

Social Club FM - 2012-13 

The first radio comedy series produced by Zipline Creative, Social Club FM, was a BBC Radio Wales sitcom based in a Valleys social club, starring Elis James, Chris Corcoran Vern Griffiths and Nadia Kamil. It ran for two series from 2012-2013 and was very well received critically. It subsequently gained a cult following with prominent comedy enthusiasts and a spin-off TV pilot was produced for BBC Three's Comedy Feeds. The show was written by Elis James (8 Out of Ten Cats, The Committee) and Gareth Gwynn (The News Quiz, The Armstrong And Miller Show) and produced by Sony Award Winning Producer Ben Walker.

Passing On - 2014 

Zipline's second radio comedy show, Passing On, was written by Gareth Gwynn and produced by Ben Partridge, and stars Felicity Montagu, Richard Elis, Keiron Self, Katy Wix, Simon Armstrong and Melangell Dolma. The six-part series was broadcast throughout July and August on BBC Radio Wales.

The plot follows the story of two very different brothers who are forced to reunite on a monthly basis thanks to an unusual clause in their mother's Will. Concerned that her two sons might drift apart after her death, she testates they meet up once a month to entrust the other with her ashes. They must do this every month without fail until the youngest brother's fortieth birthday.

The Unexplainers - 2015 

Open-minded rap star John Rutledge and sceptic stand-up comedian Mike Bubbins travel the nation unexplaining the most unexplainable mysteries.

The first four episodes include:

1. Are we surrounded by ghosts?

Mike and John find themselves drenched in ghost energy or ‘Ghenergy’ as they hear accounts from real ghost witnesses and even conduct their own ghost investigation in a haunted pub in Pontypool, South Wales.

With the help of some ghost hunting experts, they set up equipment to connect with spirits from the realms beyond science.  Will Mike have his paranormal third eye prised open for him to dare to believe? Will John glimpse a full apparition of a ghost? Find out by listening to the evidence..

2. Are big cats on the loose in the UK?

Mike's aunt once had a big cat, it was black and close to 2% larger than the average household cat. But across the UK, there are rumours of much larger cats, Pumas, Leopards and ferocious cougars living wild a terrorising farmland.

With permission from a key eyewitness farmer in North Wales, the Unexplainers set up a big cat watch nerve centre, but will a trap set with offal and, a trail camera reap rewards?

3. Did an alien spacecraft crash in North Wales?

Tabloid press dubbed it the Welsh Roswell, or RosWelsh, but did an alien lose his no claims bonus by smashing into a mountainside in north wales?
John's well educated in the ways of Aliens, he's seen at least 3 alien films and scored 10 on a ‘How to tell if you’re an Alien’ quiz on Facebook.

Mike and John hit the road north to track down first hand witnesses to extraterrestrial events. When John puts up some posters in the local town of Llandrillo they hit the eyewitness jackpot and find themselves en route to the arguably exact spot where a spaceship possibly did or did not crash.

4. Do fairies live among us?

Despite most people considering fairies to inhabit the realm of make believe, there is a large and growing army of people who claim to see them on a regular basis. John isn't one of their ranks, but he wants to be very badly.

Heading out into the ancient British countryside, the duo go in search of a chance encounter, a fleeting glimpse or a full blow package holiday to another realm. Recruiting the help of real witnesses, Iceland's leading Elf ambassador and a reluctant physicist from CERN's Hadron Collider, the hunt is on.

The debut episode reached number 10 in the UK podcast charts and it has been considered a hit considering the circumstances of its rapid rise in the charts.

Corporate Work

Through its corporate wing, Zipline Creative has produced work for Aston Martin Lagonda, The Institute Of Advanced Broadcast, The University of Wales College, Newport, and worked with actress Margaret John. They also work with local councils and not-for-profit organisations in Wales to produce campaign films and video content.

The Size Of Wales - 2011 

Rainforest charity the Size Of Wales, worked with Zipline to produce their second campaign. Shot and released in October 2011, it aimed to get the people of Wales to donate and help purchase large portions of rainforest for conservation. By mid 2012, donations have topped £1m with the video getting nearly 17,000 hits in 24 hours.

Discover Merthyr Tydfil - 2012 

Zipline produced an online promotional film for Merthyr Tydfil County Borough Council to feature on the Visit Merthyr website, with the aim of promoting activity tourism in the area. Helicopter footage of the Brecon Beacons area was used in the film to demonstrate the natural beauty of the area, and local people were recruited to take part in the range of outdoor activities featured.

Future Giants - 2013 

Zipline's first cinema advert was commissioned by Cardiff Sixth Form College to promote the higher education centre to prospective new students. The advert was produced in the style of a Hollywood film trailer, and featured current students at the college walking around the city of Cardiff in the form of giants. Zipline worked together with special effects company Burning Reel and used their onsite green screen studio to create the illusion of real giants in the city.

Time To Change Wales - 2012-14 

The Welsh mental health charity have produced a number of projects with Zipline Creative over the last two years. The first of which was 'In the Case of Dylan', a bilingual advert broadcast on ITV and S4C which highlighted the issues people often face when returning to work following leave due to mental illness, and encouraged people to talk about mental health. The advert was re-released in 2013 for cinema broadcast in South Wales. Zipline also produced event coverage films for TTCW in 2013, and a series of animated adverts in 2014 which were broadcast on S4C and nominated for an Inspire Wales Award.

Trades Union Congress animation – 2014 

The TUC commissioned Zipline to produce an animated advert to raise the issue of the cost of living crisis affecting young people in the UK. The advert was shared nationally on social media and appeared on an ITV current affairs programme about the campaign.

Awards

The team won a Welsh BAFTA for their first series of Rhod Gilbert's Work Experience, two Celtic Media Festival Award's for their second and fifth series of the Rhod Gilbert programme, and the Chamber Of Commerce Award for Young Welsh Entrepreneurs of The Year 2009.

References

External links
 www.ziplinecreative.co.uk 
 The Unexplainers on BBC website
 www.theunexplainers.com

Film production companies of the United Kingdom
Television production companies of the United Kingdom